Private Practice is an American medical drama television series that aired on ABC from September 26, 2007, to January 22, 2013. A spin-off of Grey's Anatomy, the series takes place at Seaside Health & Wellness Center (formerly Oceanside Wellness Group) and chronicles the life of Dr. Addison Montgomery, played by Kate Walsh, as she leaves Seattle Grace Hospital in order to join a private practice, located in Los Angeles. Private Practice also revolves around Addison's co-workers at Oceanside Wellness Center, and how they deal with patients and the practice while still finding time to live their everyday lives.

The series was created by Shonda Rhimes, who also serves as executive producer, alongside Betsy Beers, Mark Gordon, Mark Tinker, Craig Turk, and Steve Blackman, who served as showrunners due to Rhimes's duties on Grey's Anatomy.

On May 11, 2012, Private Practice was renewed for a sixth season. The sixth season was the only one not to feature Tim Daly and was announced on October 19, 2012, to be the final season. The series finale aired on January 22, 2013. Reruns can be seen in syndication on some local ABC stations and can be streamed on Hulu.

Series overview

Season 1 (2007)

The first season deals with Addison's move from Seattle to Los Angeles and her attempts to adjust to a very different type of working environment at Oceanside Wellness Group, a co-op private practice. The first season also deals with her budding relationships with her new co-workers. Among them include her best friend Naomi Bennett, a fertility specialist, and Naomi's ex-husband Sam Bennett, who specializes in internal medicine. Also working within the practice is psychiatrist Violet Turner, pediatrician Cooper Freedman, alternative medicine specialist Pete Wilder, and receptionist Dell Parker. It is revealed early on that the Bennetts established the practice with the rest of the doctors owning a share of it as well. Charlotte King, who serves as chief of staff at St. Ambrose Hospital, works with Oceanside Wellness through her dealings with Sam and her sexual relationship with Cooper.

Season 2 (2008–2009)

The second season begins with the practice dealing with financial troubles. Naomi reveals to Addison that they are in danger of losing the practice due to unpaid debt, causing Addison to tell Sam. This in turn causes a shift within the practice, whereby Sam and Naomi decide the new  boss will be determined by a vote among the members of the practice, resulting in the highest vote getter, Addison, taking over. More tension is added when a new practice on the fourth floor, Pacific Wellcare, competes for patients. This new practice, run by Charlotte, is causing turmoil for her and Cooper. Also in this season, Sam and Naomi finally realize they can no longer be friends, and the romantic relationship of Cooper and Charlotte deepens. Addison was romantically linked with Kevin Nelson (played by David Sutcliffe), a police officer, but later realized their relationship was going nowhere. Towards the end of the season, Addison falls in love with cardiovascular surgeon Noah Barnes, who as it turns out, is married and is expecting his first child. Matters become more complicated when Addison realizes that Noah's wife is one of her patients. Archer Montgomery (Grant Show), Addison's playboy brother, made sporadic appearances causing trouble for her and Naomi. Archer was found to have an aggressive brain tumor which was later diagnosed as parasites. Addison sought the professional help of her ex-husband, neurosurgeon Derek Shepherd (Patrick Dempsey). After Derek successfully saved Archer, Addison discovered Archer was back to his old tricks by cheating on Naomi. Violet stirred some of her own drama when she began dating Sheldon (Brian Benben), who works for Pacific Wellcare, and Pete. During the latter half of the season, Violet was found to be pregnant although she did not know who the father of her baby was. Furthermore, Violet found herself and her unborn baby at the mercy of a psychotic patient bent on taking Violet's baby by any means necessary in the closing moments of the season finale. Meanwhile, Dell struggled with his own issues caused by his former girlfriend's drug habits. He fights for custody of his daughter Betsey. Some of the medical cases that caused a stir and tension among the doctors at Private Practice was the issue of abortion (a first for the practice), the sex reassignment of a newborn, the sexual activity of a 12-year-old, the switching of embryos for two mothers-to-be and a young couple who later discovered they were siblings.

Season 3 (2009–2010)

In the third season, Violet survives the cliffhanger in season two while she gives her baby Lucas to Pete while she recovers from the ordeal. Addison and Sam get even closer but decide not to become a couple because they don't want to hurt Naomi. Charlotte and Cooper break up, and Dell loses Heather in an explosion which nearly kills Betsey.
Addison and Pete become a couple, which causes Addison to get close to Lucas until Violet wants Pete back even going as far as taking Pete to court to get joint custody. Sheldon falls for Charlotte after they start to sleep together. Sam and Naomi's daughter, Maya, gets pregnant and marries the father of her baby, Dink. Derek Shepherd's sister, Dr. Amelia Shepherd, arrives in town.
In the season finale, Addison and Sam finally get together while Charlotte and Cooper get engaged much to Sheldon's dismay. Pete and Violet work over their issues, while Dell and Maya get involved in a car accident and the severity of Dell's condition is overlooked while Maya was being attended to in the operating room. Dr. Amelia Shepherd, younger sister of Derek Shepherd (Addison's ex-husband), operated on him but was unable to resuscitate following Dell's heart failure. Maya survived her operation to save her spinal cord and prevented paralysis while at the same time she gives birth to a girl, who also survives the ordeal.

Season 4 (2010–2011)

In the fourth season Brian Benben and Caterina Scorsone were upgraded to series regulars. The season begins with the aftermath of Dell's death, and what happens to his daughter Betsey. Violet and Pete get married in the season premiere and begin a new life with their son Lucas. Addison and Sam reveal their romance to the staff of Oceanside Wellness, a development that Naomi accepts, upon which she leaves leave town to learn. Cooper and Charlotte get engaged. Charlotte is raped and badly beaten by one of the patients at her hospital. She tells only Addison about this, and swears her to secrecy. Later everyone finds out but she initially refuses to identify Lee McHenry as her rapist. It is later revealed that Violet was raped when she was in college. Charlotte eventually identifies Lee at the urging of because Sheldon. She goes to the police, but since she did not come forward immediately, prosecutors decline to charge Lee. However, when threatens his girlfriend, she stabs him in self defense, forcing Charlotte to save his life on the operating table. His girlfriend reports this to the authorities, which results in his arrest. In the season finale, it is decided Oceanside Wellness will be closed, and a new practice will be opened. Naomi decides it would be best to move to New York to be with Gabriel.

Season 5 (2011–2012)

On January 10, 2011, ABC renewed Private Practice for a fifth season. Audra McDonald, who plays the character Naomi Bennett, did not return as a regular cast member in the fifth season of Private Practice. Following the departure of Audra McDonald, Benjamin Bratt was added to the series as a regular cast member. He plays Jake Reilly, a fertility specialist "who is quite accomplished and up to speed with cutting-edge technology and procedures." The fifth season focuses on Amelia and her drug addiction, and the entire practice trying to save her life, ultimately deciding to have an intervention for her, and thus sending her to rehab. After rehab, Amelia finds out that she is pregnant by Ryan, a boyfriend who got her back into drugs and later died of an overdose. She finds out that the baby does not have a brain, but ultimately decides to take the baby to full term and donate the organs to save other children's lives. Later in the season, Cooper was revealed to have had an 8-year-old son from a previous one night stand. The son, who is named Mason, is portrayed by child actor Griffin Gluck. While Gluck initially served as a guest star, he was promoted to series regular later in the season. Gluck is notable for being the first child to be a series regular in Private Practice, or in the original series Grey's Anatomy. Mason's mother sought out Cooper after discovering that she was stricken with cancer, and she dies later in the season. Season 5 also deals with Addison not being able to have her own children, only to be able to adopt a child, Henry, just as Amelia's tragic news is given.

Season 6 (2012–2013)

On May 11, 2012, ABC renewed Private Practice for a sixth season, which premiered on September 25, 2012. Tim Daly, who plays Pete Wilder, did not return to the main cast in season six. In the sixth season premiere, Violet finds out that Pete hasn't shown up for court and assumes that he ran off only to find out later that he had a heart attack jogging and died. Charlotte finds outs that she's pregnant but is happy because her IUD will most likely destroy the pregnancy, only to find out she's pregnant with triplets. After a difficult pregnancy and even delivering one of the triplets at 26 weeks, Charlotte and Cooper eventually have three healthy daughters. The final episode of the series brings many happy endings: Addison and Jake marry; Sheldon quits the practice to spend time with his love who's dying of cancer; Sam and Naomi remarry and will be having a second baby; Amelia has found the love of her life; Violet finally gets over her issues with Pete's death and announces she's started writing her book.

Shortly after the May renewal, speculation arose that this would be the final season of the series. Private Practice creator Shonda Rhimes confirmed on October 19, 2012, that season six and the show would end with the thirteenth episode.

Crossovers
Throughout the series' run, Private Practice had a handful of crossovers with its sister show, Grey's Anatomy.
 Season 1
 Private Practice:  Richard Webber (James Pickens Jr.) appears in the opening minutes of the first episode convincing Addison to stay in Seattle.  She says that she is leaving and he tells her he'll keep her job open for as long as he can and the two part ways.
 Grey's Anatomy:  Addison Montgomery (Kate Walsh) returns to Seattle Grace for the first time since she left to perform a risky operation.  She is shocked to learn how significantly everyone's lives have changed since she leftNote: This episode took place while Private Practice was on an extended hiatus due to the 2007–2008 Writers Guild of America strike.

 Season 2In February, Grey's Anatomy and Private Practice did their first extensive crossover storyline.  The 3-episode arc started on Grey's Anatomy when Addison, Naomi Bennett (Audra McDonald) bring Archer Montgomery (Grant Show) to Seattle Grace to meet with Derek Shepherd (Patrick Dempsey), Mark Sloan (Eric Dane), Meredith Grey (Ellen Pompeo), and Richard to remove the parasites from Archer's brain.  At first Derek says it's inoperable until Sam Bennett (Taye Diggs) later comes to Seattle and gives medical advice on how to remove the parasites. Derek and Meredith perform the operation successfully. The episode ends with Derek's patient Jen Harmon (Jennifer Westfeldt) having a complication from the brain surgery Derek performed on her shortly after Archer's surgery. The story continues on Private Practice where Sam has a sudden asthma attack and is treated by Naomi and Miranda Bailey (Chandra Wilson). Richard wants to publicize Archer's case. Mark convinces Sam that he had an asthma attack because of the stress of Archer being with Naomi who he still has feelings for. Addison assists Derek and Alex Karev (Justin Chambers) on Jen's case. The episode ends with Jen having another complication. The story concludes on Grey's Anatomy. At this point, Naomi, Sam and Archer have returned to L.A. but Derek asks Addison to stay. Derek and Addison have an argument on their course of action for Jen and Jen dies in surgery.

 Season 3 Private Practice:  In the third episode, Miranda Bailey comes to Los Angeles with a patient to meet with the patients sister about a kidney transplant.

In January, the show did another extensive crossover story with Grey's Anatomy. Addison comes to Seattle to operate on Mark's daughter, Sloan Riley (Leven Rambin). Then Mark and Sloan travel to Los Angeles for more surgery. Addison and Mark have an ongoing tryst during this crossover.

 Season 4Grey's Anatomy:  In that seasons' third episode Amelia Shepherd (Caterina Scorsone) comes to Seattle to reconcile with Derek.
 Grey's Anatomy:  Addison returns in the musical episode to assist the doctors on Callie Torres (Sara Ramirez) who had gotten into a serious car accident and was 6 months pregnant at the time. This is mentioned to explain Addison's absence in the Private Practice episode "The Hardest Part".
 Season 5Grey's Anatomy and Private Practice did their last crossover before the series finale in 2013. On Grey's Anatomy, Amelia returns to Seattle to convince Derek and Lexie Grey (Chyler Leigh) to operate on Erica Warner (A.J. Langer) who has a gliosarcoma. Lexie helps Amelia practice and Derek eventually agrees to help as well. Then on Private Practice, Cooper Freedman (Paul Adelstein) and Charlotte King (KaDee Strickland) bring Erica to Seattle Grace to meet with Derek, Lexie and Amelia about the operation. Erica's surgery is successful.

 Season 6Despite no characters crossing over, Addison receives a phone call from Derek about Mark's passing, which happens at the start of Grey's Anatomy's ninth season.

 After Private Practice
In April 2014, Amelia returned to Grey's Anatomy for the last four episodes of the tenth season. She became a series regular from the eleventh season onwards.

In October 2021, Addison returned to Grey's Anatomy for two episodes of the eighteenth season. She performs a uterine transplant with the help of Meredith and allows for the surgery to be a teaching moment for Richard's residents. She later also reconnects with Amelia with whom she discusses life during the COVID-19 pandemic and meets Meredith and Derek's children.

Cast

Production

Origin and development

On , :The Wall Street Journal reported that ABC was pursuing a spin-off of Grey's Anatomy featuring Kate Walsh's character Addison Montgomery. Subsequent reports confirmed the report, stating that an expanded two-hour broadcast of Grey's Anatomy (which aired ) would serve as a backdoor pilot for the spin-off. The backdoor pilot episode features Montgomery on leave from Seattle Grace Hospital, the clinic in Los Angeles is named the Oceanside Wellness Centre. The broadcast served as the 22nd and 23rd episodes of the season (out of 25), and was directed by Michael Grossman, according to Variety. Gossip columnists Kristin Veitch and Michael Ausiello reported that the spinoff would be set in Los Angeles.

Casting
On , it was announced by ABC that Merrin Dungey, who played the role of Naomi Bennett, would be replaced by four time Tony winner Audra McDonald. ABC gave no reason for this change. On , it was announced that a new character, played by KaDee Strickland, had been added to the main cast. Tony Award Winner Idina Menzel appeared in two episodes during the second season. Menzel was married to Private Practice star Taye Diggs. David Sutcliffe, Jayne Brook, and Josh Hopkins also appeared in Private Practice.

Location
Private Practice films a lot of their exterior shots (as well as some of their outdoor storylines) in Santa Monica, California. The Oceanside Group building can be found at the corner of 4th and Wilshire in Santa Monica, California. Addison Montgomery and Sam Bennett live in rare Malibu beachfront houses right on the sand, which in reality would cost upwards of $4 million each.

Broadcast
On , the backdoor pilot of Private Practice aired on ABC. The pilot was in the double episode of Grey's Anatomy titled "The Other Side of This Life", and gave a brief description of the characters in Private Practice. The cast included Amy Brenneman, Paul Adelstein, Tim Daly, Taye Diggs, Chris Lowell, and Merrin Dungey.

The 2-hour episode averaged 21 million viewers, 1.9 million more viewers than Grey's Anatomy's third season 19.1 million viewers-per-episode average at the time of its airing. The episode was also No. 1 in the 9:00 pm and 10:00 pm time-slots. On , it was announced, on The Ellen DeGeneres Show, that Private Practice was part of ABC's 2007 fall line-up. It was later moved to Thursday at 10:00 pm after Grey's Anatomy during mid-season 2009, to make room for the return of Lost.

Syndication

Private Practice started airing in broadcast syndication on weekends beginning September 15, 2012.

International

Home media
To date, Walt Disney Studios Home Entertainment (under the ABC Studios brand) has released the entire series on DVD in Regions 1, 2, and 4. The series is also available for download on iTunes Store.

Reception
Private Practice initially received mixed reviews. Metacritic, which assigns a weighted mean rating out of 100 to reviews from mainstream critics, gave the show a score of 45 based on 25 critical reviews. The first episode was somewhat panned by critics and The New York Times described the show's characters as "collectively offer[ing] one of the most depressing portrayals of the female condition since The Bell Jar."

U.S. television ratings

Awards and accolades

Turkish adaptation 
A Turkish adaptation titled Merhaba Hayat began airing on Fox in February 2013.

References

External links

 
 

2007 American television series debuts
2013 American television series endings
2000s American drama television series
2010s American drama television series
2000s American medical television series
American Broadcasting Company original programming
2010s American medical television series
2010s American LGBT-related drama television series
American television spin-offs
American television soap operas
American primetime television soap operas
English-language television shows
Grey's Anatomy
Television franchises
Television shows set in Los Angeles
Television shows set in Malibu, California
Television shows set in Santa Monica, California
Television series created by Shonda Rhimes
Television series by ABC Studios
Television series by Shondaland
Television series by Entertainment One
2000s American LGBT-related drama television series
 
Television Academy Honors winners